Mågerø is the private holiday home and summer retreat of the Norwegian royal Family. The compound is located on the small Mågerø peninsula on the Tjøme island, which is also the retreats namesake.

History 
The royal family had owned several holiday retreats prior to the construction of Mågerø. This included the villa Bloksberg at Hankø, originally purchased and owned by King Olav, and the estate Berget, which was owned by Queen Sonja's family. The royal family was, however, bothered by the lack of privacy at the former retreats, and therefore wanted a proper, shelter holiday home to be constructed when King Harald and Queen Sonja ascended the throne in 1991. The complex was designed by Lund Hagem Arkitekter, and build between 1991 and 1993. 

For security reasons, the retreat is located at the military area Control and Reporting Centre, which is controlled by the Norwegian Air Force.

References

External links 
 

Houses completed in 1993
Palaces in Norway
Royal residences in Norway